Odalengo Piccolo (Audalengh Cit in Piedmontese) is a commune (comune) of the Province of Alessandria in the northwest Italian region Piedmont. It borders on the communes of Alfiano Natta, Castelletto Merli, Cerrina Monferrato, Odalengo Grande, and Villadeati.

The two principal centres of population are Serra (dialect: Sèra), the site of the town hall, and Vicinato (dialect: V’žinà) with the parish church; further nuclei are Palmaro (dialect: Cà di Parmàn), Dorato, and Pessine (dialect: Psìn-i) which is notable for its castle.

Odalengo Piccolo is known for the truffle fair Tufo & tartufo, which has been held during the autumn truffle season since 1994, and for the wide variety of antique native apple cultivars which are grown locally.

Toponyms
Odalengo enters the historical record in 1298–99 as Odalengum ultra Sturiam. The form Odalengum minus, which distinguishes ‘Little Odalengo’ from the nearby Odalengo Grande, is recorded in 1306;  Odalengum parvum is found in 1320 and Odalengo Prato in 1474.

Vicinato appears as Viscenale in 1279, while Serra is apparently recorded as Serra in 1163 and Pessine as Pisinum in 1171.

References
 

Cities and towns in Piedmont